Here are the nominees and winners of the Black Reel Award for Best Outstanding Supporting Actor, TV Movie or Limited Series. The category was reinstated in 2013 after a five-year hiatus.

Most Wins
Jeffrey Wright - 2 wins

Multiple Nominees
 Mekhi Phifer - 3 nominations 
 Harry Lennix, Danny Glover, Bokeem Woodbine, Terrence Howard, Jeffrey Wright, Charles S. Dutton - 2 nominations

Winners/Nominees

References

Black Reel Awards
Television awards for Best Supporting Actor